"Change Partners" is the third episode of the American crime comedy-drama television series Terriers. The episode was written by consulting producer Phoef Sutton, and directed by Guy Ferland. It was first broadcast on FX in the United States on September 22, 2010.

The series is set in Ocean Beach, San Diego and focuses on ex-cop and recovering alcoholic Hank Dolworth (Donal Logue) and his best friend, former criminal Britt Pollack (Michael Raymond-James), who both decide to open an unlicensed private investigation business. In the episode, Hank needs money to pay for his mortgage and accepts a case where a man accuses his wife of infidelity. Meanwhile, Britt is contacted by an old friend from his criminal past.

According to Nielsen Media Research, the episode was seen by an estimated 0.568 million household viewers and gained a 0.2/1 ratings share among adults aged 18–49. The episode received extremely positive reviews from critics, who praised the performances, character dynamics, and character development.

Plot
A man named Jason Adler (Loren Dean) is trying on suits when he pumps into Britt (Michael Raymond-James). Britt steals Jason's wallet, with Hank (Donal Logue) claiming that it is part of a job. However, Britt sees Gretchen (Kimberly Quinn) and realizes that he is her fiancé.

Hank needs a lending institution for his mortgage, which he is struggling with. He is approached by Armand Foster (Shawn Doyle), head of the mortgage agency, who asks for his help in following his wife Miriam (Olivia Williams), whom he suspects of having an affair in exchange for financial help. He tries to get Britt on board, but Britt refuses to participate, having just been robbed at a bar just a few moments ago. When Britt returns home with Katie (Laura Allen), he finds that his old friend from his burglary days, Ray (Maximiliano Hernández) is visiting. Ray tries to convince Britt to help him with a robbery, but Britt declines the offer.

Hank follows Miriam but finds no evidence of infidelity. Armand is furious at his lack of progress and dismisses him, declining to help him. Hank convinces him to give him a few more days. With Britt's help, he follows Miriam to a plaza. Miriam recognizes him and attacks him with pepper spray, before discovering that Armand sent him. She explains that Armand made her cheat on him, and the humiliation excites him, telling her to keep having affairs, but she just lies to him. Meanwhile, Ray stalks Katie, demanding that Britt work for him again and that she doesn't know his past.

In order to fool Armand, Hank suggests staging an affair. Hank, Britt, Miriam, and Katie meet in a motel room, where Miriam and Britt will pretend to be on an affair, supervised by Katie and photographed by Hank. With the "affair" investigated, Hank delivers the pictures to Armand, who agrees to his terms of the mortgage. That night, Hank has an awkward dinner with Gretchen and Jason at his house. After they leave, he is visited by Miriam, who informs him that Armand now wants to witness the affair himself. They then kiss and have sex. By the next morning, she has left his house by the time he woke up. Hank goes to the bar, where Britt shows up with a ski mask, pretending to be Ray and rob it. Hank seizes his gun, prompting him to leave and sending the gun to the police. Britt then meets with Katie at the motel room, stating that the plan went as planned and that Ray will go to jail as his fingerprints were on the gun.

Hank meets with Armand for the mortgage papers, but he states that he is aware of their plan; he searched for Britt on the internet, linking him to Hank and also made Miriam confess the affair to him. He refuses to help him with the papers, so Hank explains in detail about having sex with Miriam the previous night. Humiliated, Armand signs the papers but tells him to never see him ever again. Hank leaves but returns for a missing signature, only to discover that Armand has committed suicide by jumping out the window. He left behind a note, which reads "I only meant to hurt myself". Using his papers, he forges the missing signature and leaves his office.

Back at their house, Britt tells Katie that he and Ray worked together to rob houses, one of which included Katie's. Staring at her pictures, Britt pursued Katie and eventually met her. She acts mad at the confession but also tells Britt to meet with her soon for sex. Hank visits Miriam at her house, to tell her she can't feel guilty for her husband's death. When he mentions that he was with him and mentioned their night together, prompting her to leave him in disgust. Hank returns home and plays his guitar. Unaware to him, a person sneaks into his attic.

Reception

Viewers
The episode was watched by 0.568 million viewers, earning a 0.2/1 in the 18-49 rating demographics on the Nielson ratings scale. This means that 0.2 percent of all households with televisions watched the episode, while 1 percent of all households watching television at that time watched it. This was a 31% decrease in viewership from the previous episode, which was watched by 0.822 million viewers with a 0.4/1 in the 18-49 rating demographics.

Critical reviews
"Change Partners" received extremely positive reviews from critics. Noel Murray of The A.V. Club gave the episode an "A-" grade and wrote, "Carrying the theme of change and recidivism even further, 'Change Partners' delivers a huge chunk of the Britt and Hank origin story (something that, after last week's tease, I'd assumed would be trickling out over the rest of the season)."

Alan Sepinwall of HitFix wrote, "Just a fantastic episode, and I'm hopeful the show's creative bonafides will convince FX to consider a second season in spite of some very bad ratings thus far."

Matt Richenthal of TV Fanatic gave the episode a 4.7 star rating out of 5 and wrote, "Easily my favorite episode so far, 'Change Partners' gave us new insight into both these men and none of it felt forced. The connection between Hank and Britt feels real, so does the latter's relationship to Katie (who used to hook... just kidding!) and I can't wait to see in which direction the show goes next." Cory Barker of TV Overmind wrote, "'Change Partners' is not only an informative episode because of its revelations about Britt's past or how dirty Hank can get, but also a highly intense story that starts off goofy but quickly turns bleak. And it is definitely the best of the three aired episodes of Terriers thus far."

References

External links
 

2010 American television episodes
Terriers episodes